is a video game developed by WOW Entertainment for the Sega NAOMI and Dreamcast in 2000-2001.

Reception

The Dreamcast version received "mixed" reviews according to the review aggregation website Metacritic. Rob Smolka of NextGen said of the game, "Essentially a group of sports-based Java applets, there's enough charm and challenge to keep you coming back to improve your score." In Japan, Famitsu gave it a score of 27 out of 40.

Also in Japan, Game Machine listed the arcade version in their February 15, 2001 issue as the third most-successful arcade game of the month.

References

External links
 
 

2000 video games
Agetec games
Arcade video games
Dreamcast games
Multiplayer and single-player video games
Sega arcade games
Sega video games
Sports video games
Video games developed in Japan
WOW Entertainment games